Mallari is a Kapampangan-language surname. Notable people with the surname include:

Alex Mallari (born 1987), Filipino-American basketball player
Alex Mallari Jr. (born 1988), Canadian actor
Erwin Mallari (born 1979), Filipino artist
Ismael Mallari, Filipino writer
Joy Mallari (born 1966), Filipino painter and artist

Kapampangan-language surnames